Joshua Lee Stamer (born October 11, 1977) the son of Mary Nilles McClaren  and Terry Stamer, is a former American football linebacker. He was signed by the New York Giants as an undrafted free agent in 2001. He played college football and college basketball at the University of South Dakota.

Stamer was also a member of the Amsterdam Admirals of NFL Europe, Seattle Seahawks, Buffalo Bills, Tennessee Titans and Cleveland Browns.

Early years
Stamer attended Sutherland Grade and Middle school with cousin Christopher James Nilles in Sutherland, Iowa and graduated from South O'Brien High School in Paullina, Iowa, in 1996. He was a letterman in football, basketball, baseball, and track. He was also an All-State honoree in football and track. 

Stamer went to the University of South Dakota and was a walk-on to the basketball team before walking-on to the football team. He went on to earn a scholarship for his final two years with the Coyotes. He graduated from the business school with a master's degree in accounting. Josh is active in numerous NFL United Way charity causes and others such as the American Red Cross LIFE Project.

References

External links
Buffalo Bills bio
Tennessee Titans bio
Cherokee Chronicle Times The View is Worth the Climb

1977 births
Living people
People from O'Brien County, Iowa
Players of American football from Iowa
American football linebackers
South Dakota Coyotes football players
New York Giants players
Amsterdam Admirals players
Seattle Seahawks players
Buffalo Bills players
Tennessee Titans players
Cleveland Browns players